Novye Zori is a rural locality (a settlement) and the administrative center of Novozorinsky Selsoviet, Pavlovsky District, Altai Krai, Russia. The population was 3,299 as of 2013. There are 38 streets.

Geography 
Novye Zori is located 41 km southeast of Pavlovsk (the district's administrative centre) by road. Komsomolsky and Lesnoy are the nearest rural localities.

References 

Rural localities in Pavlovsky District, Altai Krai